Ojhri Camp was a military storage center located in Rawalpindi Military District in Rawalpindi, Punjab Province of Pakistan, and the site of the 1988 Ojhri Camp disaster.

Events 
On April 10, 1988 at about 10:30am, the camp which was used as an ammunition depot for Afghan mujahideen fighting against Soviet forces in Afghanistan, exploded, killing many in Rawalpindi and Islamabad as a result of rockets and other munitions expelled by the blast. At the time, the New York Times reported more than 93 dead and another 1,100 wounded; many believe that the toll was much higher. A total of 10,000 tons of arms and ammunition were involved in the explosion.

The initial blast was started by a small fire created by a box of Egyptian rockets which had been armed with fuses prior to shipment contrary to safety protocol. The rockets had been sent by the United States Central Intelligence Agency to the Pakistani Inter-Services Intelligence (ISI) for delivery to the mujahideen commanders as part of Operation Cyclone. There was an eight to ten minute delay between the start of the fire and the explosion. The previous year, a fire had been started by leaky white phosphorus grenades but was extinguished promptly, preventing an explosion.

Reactions 
U.S. Defense Department officials said that they believed that the explosion at Ojhri Camp was the work of the Soviet Union and the pro-Soviet regime in Kabul, as the explosion resembled the pattern of previous attacks by the Soviet Union and the Kabul regime against civilians and military installations in Pakistan. 

However, there were also some speculations that the camp was deliberately blown up to cover up the theft of weapons from the stocks. Furthermore, Brigadier Mohammad Yousaf, who oversaw the operations of the mujahideen in his role as the head of the ISI's Afghan Bureau from 1983 to 1987, suggested that while the Soviets had the most obvious motive, the CIA may also have had a hand in the explosion, as an Islamic fundamentalist government in Kabul was just as dangerous as a communist one to US interests.

Aftermath 
The Geneva Accords were signed just 4 days later, and the Soviets were able to withdraw without any major ambushes, claiming only one casualty on their retreat. This event hindered the mujahideen's capability to fill the power vacuum, as their weapons reserves were depleted and the CIA cut back their shipment of arms until December.

Khaqan Abbasi, the father of future Prime Minister of Pakistan Shahid Khaqan Abbasi, died in the disaster as his car was hit by a missile, while his son Zahid Khaqan Abbasi suffered head injuries as a result of missile shrapnel piercing his skull, after which he went into a coma and died in 2005, having remained bedridden for 17 years.

References

External links
Investorsiraq.com
Dawn.com
Ojhri Faraz memoir 
Remembering the Ojhri Camp Blast
Recovered Footage - Remembering the Ojhri Camp Blast Awaztoday.tv

Military history of Pakistan
Rawalpindi District
Explosions in Pakistan
1988 in Pakistan
Ammunition dumps